Lucien Georges François Philippe Cooremans (1 September 1899 – 22 February 1985) was a Belgian liberal politician and burgomaster of Brussels.

Lucien Cooremans was a lawyer, journalist and professor at the Universite Libre de Bruxelles. As a politician he was a member of parliament, alderman and burgomaster of Brussels from 1956 until 1975. He was the leading figure of the Brussels world fair Expo '58 in 1958. He was responsible for the destruction of the Maison du Peuple. In 1958 he was awarded the Order of Saint Agatha by the Republic of San Marino.

See also
 List of mayors of the City of Brussels

References

Sources
 Van Molle, P., Het Belgisch parlement 1894–1969, Gent, Erasmus, 1969, p. 48.
 Le Livre Bleu. Recueil biographique, Brussel, Maison Ferd. Larcier, 1950, p. 93.
 Brussels (Municipality, Region of Brussels-Capital, Belgium)
 Lettre de Lucien Cooremans au baron Snoy et d'Oppuers (9 novembre 1957)

1899 births
1985 deaths
Mayors of the City of Brussels